Tea is a city in Lincoln County, South Dakota, United States and is a suburb of Sioux Falls. The population was 5,598 at the 2020 census.

Tea was laid out in 1894. The name "Tea" was selected on account of its brevity.

Geography
Tea is located at  (43.448055, -96.837587).

Demographics

2010 census
As of the census of 2010, there were 3,806 people, 1,254 households, and 1,009 families living in the city. The racial makeup of the city was 96.9% White, 0.7% African American, 0.1% Native American, 0.1% Asian, 0.3% from other races, and 1.9% from two or more races. Hispanic or Latino of any race were 1.3% of the population.

There were 1,254 households, of which 59.1% had children under the age of 18 living with them, 63.2% were married couples living together, 12.6% had a female householder with no husband present, 4.7% had a male householder with no wife present, and 19.5% were non-families. 14.0% of all households were made up of individuals, and 2.2% had someone living alone who was 65 years of age or older. The average household size was 3.04 and the average family size was 3.35.

The median age in the city was 27.7 years. 37.5% of residents were under the age of 18; 7.6% were between the ages of 18 and 24; 38.3% were from 25 to 44; 13.9% were from 45 to 64; and 3% were 65 years of age or older. The gender makeup of the city was 50.6% male and 49.4% female.

2000 census
As of the census of 2000, there were 1,742 people, 590 households, and 489 families living in the city. The population density was 2,877.8 people per square mile (1,102.6/km2). There were 600 housing units at an average density of 991.2 per square mile (379.8/km2). The racial makeup of the city was 96.67% White, 0.40% African American, 0.34% Native American, 0.34% Asian, 0.06% Pacific Islander, 0.40% from other races, and 1.78% from two or more races. Hispanic or Latino of any race were 0.86% of the population.

There were 590 households, out of which 55.6% had children under the age of 18 living with them, 67.3% were married couples living together, 12.7% had a female householder with no husband present, and 17.1% were non-families. 13.1% of all households were made up of individuals, and 2.2% had someone living alone who was 65 years of age or older. The average household size was 2.95 and the average family size was 3.23.

In the city, the population was spread out, with 36.2% under the age of 18, 7.3% from 18 to 24, 40.8% from 25 to 44, 12.5% from 45 to 64, and 3.2% who were 65 years of age or older. The median age was 28 years. For every 100 females, there were 98.4 males. For every 100 females age 18 and over, there were 94.9 males.

As of 2000 the median income for a household in the city was $50,671, and the median income for a family was $52,297. Males had a median income of $32,734 versus $23,860 for females. The per capita income for the city was $17,719. About 2.1% of families and 3.1% of the population were below the poverty line, including 3.8% of those under age 18 and 5.8% of those age 65 or over.

Education
Tea Public Schools are part of the Tea Area School District. The Tea Area School District has three elementary schools, one middle school, and one high school. Students attend Tea Area High School.

Parks
Tea contains three recreational areas: Tea Athletic Complex, Howling Ridge Park, and Prairie Trails Park.

References

External links
 Official website

Cities in Lincoln County, South Dakota
Cities in South Dakota
Sioux Falls, South Dakota metropolitan area